Jiaojiawan subdistrict is a subdistrict of Chengguan District, Lanzhou, Gansu Province, People's Republic of China.

The former Gongxingdun Airport is entirely in Jiaojiawan subdistrict, it is now the Lanzhou PLA Air Force housing district. It is also the site of the Gansu branch of the National Fitness Center.

Communities
Jiaojiawan subdistrict governs four communities:
 Gongxingdun
 Jiaojiawan
 Jiayuguan East Road
 Jiaojiawan South Road

Schools
 Lanzhou Number 37 Middle School
 Gansu Sports School
 Gongxingdun Primary School

References
 

Geography of Lanzhou
Township-level divisions of Gansu
Subdistricts of the People's Republic of China